Bob Kellaway (born 24 November 1955) is a former professional rugby league footballer who played in the 1980s for Bradford Northern where he played for the Queensland Maroons from 1982 to 1984.

References

External links
Bob Kellaway FOG'S

1955 births
Australian rugby league players
Bradford Bulls players
Queensland Rugby League State of Origin players
Living people
Rugby articles needing expert attention
Place of birth missing (living people)